Fleetmatics was a private company owned by Verizon providing software-as-a-service fleet management. Based in Dublin, Ireland it offers both web-based and mobile application services that provide fleet operators with information on vehicle location, speed, mileage, fuel usage. Verizon has the largest GPS fleet management system globally with over 1.8 million vehicles managed through over 80,000 customers. Fleetmatics also provides field management, job scheduling and workflow services.

Company overview
Fleetmatics Group PLC, founded in 2004, is a provider of fleet management services delivered as software-as-a-service. In 2010 FleetMatics acquired US software company SageQuest LLC which provides GPS vehicle management tools for utility, cable and broadband companies throughout North America. In 2016 FleetMatics expanded its Southern Europe presence through the acquisition of Inosat Global

Verizon announced its intention to buy Fleetmatics for $2.4 billion in cash on August 1, 2016  and the deal was consummated in November 2016

In October 2017, Fleetmatics registered Electronic Logging Device (ELD) for Android with the Federal Motor Carrier Safety Administration (FMCSA).

On March 6, 2018, Fleetmatics, along with sister companies Telogis and Verizon Telematics, rebranded as Verizon Connect.

References

Fleet management
Companies based in Dublin (city)
Companies listed on the New York Stock Exchange